The 4.5 inch gun M1 was a field gun developed in the United States in the beginning of World War II. It shared the same carriage with the 155mm Howitzer M1 and fired the same ammunition as the British BL 4.5 inch Medium Field Gun. Beginning in 1944, the weapon was used by the U.S. Army as corps-level artillery; with the end of hostilities, it was declared obsolete.

Development and production
In 1920 the US Army Ordnance Department started to work on a new medium field gun. Since the US Army had already employed the 4.7-inch gun M1906 prior to World War I, and during the war in limited numbers, this caliber was also selected for the new weapon. The development resulted in the 4.7-inch Gun M1922E on Carriage M1921E. Because of lack of funding, the design never reached production.

In 1939 the program was restarted; the renewed design, designated the 4.7-inch gun T3, was ready by early 1940. It utilized the same carriage as the concurrently developed 155 mm howitzer. At this stage, the Army decided to change the caliber of the weapon to use British 4.5-inch ammunition. The modified gun was standardized in April 1941 as the 4.5-inch Gun M1 on Carriage M1.

Production started in September 1942 and continued until February 1944.

Description
The M1 was very similar in construction and appearance to the 155mm Howitzer M1. The only significant difference was its tube of 4.5 inch (114 mm) caliber. The tube had uniform right hand twist, with one turn in 32 calibers. The unbalanced weight of the barrel was supported by two equilibrator springs. The breach was of interrupted screw type; the recoil system hydro-pneumatic, variable length. The carriage was of split trail type, unsprung and had wheels with pneumatic tires. In firing position, the weapon was supported by a retractable pedestal. The gun was equipped with M12 panoramic sight.

Service

The M1 equipped 16 field artillery battalions in Northwest Europe; the 172nd, 176th, 199th, 211th, 259th, 770th through 775th, 777th, 935th, 939th, 941st, and 959th. 

It was employed for corps support. M5 High Speed Tractors was assigned as prime movers. The weapon was declared obsolete in September 1945. The gun had good range, longer than the World War I-era 155 mm Gun M1918MI, and nearly five kilometers longer than its 155 mm howitzer sibling. It was out-ranged by the newer 155 mm Gun M1, but this weapon was nearly three times heavier. On the other hand, the 4.5-inch gun was criticized for the insufficient power of its high-explosive shell. The shell was produced from low grade ("19 ton") steel, which necessitated thick walls. As a result, it carried only about two kilograms of TNT or substitute, less than the 105 mm high-explosive shell. Additionally, it was felt that having a small number of guns of an atypical caliber unnecessarily complicated logistics.

Variants

 4.7 inch Gun M1920 on Carriage M1920.
 4.7 inch Gun M1922E on Carriage M1921E.
 4.7 inch Gun T3 (1940).
 4.5 inch Gun M1 on Carriage M1 (1941).

The weapon was experimentally mounted on a lengthened chassis of the M5 light tank, in mount M1. The resulting vehicle received the designation 4.5in Gun Motor Carriage T16. A single prototype was built.

Ammunition
The M1 utilized separate loading, bagged charge ammunition. Only high explosive projectile was available.

The projectile could be fired with propelling charge M7 (normal) at reduced velocity or with propelling charge M8 (super) to achieve full velocity. The dummy propelling charge M6 simulated the M8 charge. The velocity and range data in the table below is for the M8 charge.

See also
 Field artillery
 List of U.S. Army weapons by supply catalog designation – Item C38
 BL 4.5-inch Medium Field Gun – British weapon using same ammunition

Notes

References

 
 
 
 
 
 
 
 
 

World War II artillery of the United States
World War II field artillery
114 mm artillery
Weapons and ammunition introduced in 1942